This article lists Belgian provinces and regions (NUTS 2) by gross domestic product (GDP).

By GDP 
This table reports the gross domestic product (nominal GDP), expressed in billions of euro, of the ten provinces and the Brussels capital region in 2019.

 Flemish Region
 Walloon Region

By GDP per capita 
This table reports the gross domestic product (adjusted for purchasing power parity), expressed in euro, of the ten provinces and the Brussels capital region in 2018.

 Flemish Region
 Walloon Region

See also 
 List of Belgian provinces by Human Development Index

References 

Gross state product
 GDP
Provinces by GDP
Provinces by GDP
Belgium